Cyrtopsis is a genus of fungi in the class Dothideomycetes. The relationship of this taxon to other taxa within the class is unknown (incertae sedis). A monotypic genus, it contains the single species Cyrtopsis fumosa.

See also
List of Dothideomycetes genera incertae sedis

References

Dothideomycetes enigmatic taxa
Monotypic Dothideomycetes genera
Taxa named by Edvard August Vainio